In taxonomy, Methanosalsum is a genus of microbes within the family Methanosarcinaceae. This genus contains two species.

Methanosalsum zhilinae was isolated from the saline and alkaline sediments of Wadi Natrun in Egypt and from Lake Magadi. It is moderately halophilic.

Methanosalsum natronophilum (natronophilum means soda-loving) was isolated from hypersaline soda lakes.

References

Further reading

Scientific journals

Scientific books

Scientific databases

External links

Methanosalsum at BacDive –  the Bacterial Diversity Metadatabase

Archaea genera
Euryarchaeota